The communauté d'agglomération de Hagenau (CAH) is a communauté d'agglomération situated in the Bas-Rhin department and the Grand Est region of France. It's part of the pôle métropolitain d'Alsace, a federation of large Alsacian intercommunalities.

Created 1 January 2017, it's composed of 36 communes with a population of close to 96,000 residents and seated in Haguenau. Since 9 January 2017, Claude Sturni has been President of the communauté d'agglomération.

Composition 
On 1 January 2017, the communauté d'agglomération de Haguenau was composed of 96,118 residents in 36 communes over a geographic area of 399.2 km2.

Administration

President

References 

Haguenau
Haguenau